Forman Elmer Whitcomb (July 24, 1866 – April 3, 1945) was an American teacher, principal, and politician from New York.

Life 
Whitcomb was born on July 24, 1866 in Smithboro, New York. He was the son of John Milton Whitcomb, a farmer, and Mary Louisa Richards.

Whitcomb attended Owego Free Academy. He then taught for many years and served as principal of the school in Vestal from 1898 to 1906. He then moved to Endicott, where he worked in the Ideal Factory of the Endicott Johnson Corp. He served as village president of Union and justice of the peace for the town of Union.

In 1917, Whitcomb was elected to the New York State Assembly as a Republican, representing the Broome County 2nd District. He served in the Assembly in 1918, 1919, 1920, 1921, 1922, 1923, 1924, 1925, 1926, 1927, 1928, 1929, 1930, 1931, and 1932.

In 1891, Whitcomb married Marion Josephine Tuthill. They had a daughter named Mary Louise. After Marion died in 1924, he married Florence Wolcott Brooks. After Florence died, he married Lois C. He was a member of the Freemasons, the Independent Order of Odd Fellows, and the Improved Order of Red Men. He was a Methodist.

Whitcomb died at home in Tioga Center on April 3, 1945. He was buried in the Smithboro Cemetery.

References

External links 

 The Political Graveyard
 Forman E. Whitcomb at Find a Grave

1866 births
1945 deaths
People from Tioga County, New York
People from Vestal, New York
People from Endicott, New York
Schoolteachers from New York (state)
American school principals
20th-century American politicians
Republican Party members of the New York State Assembly
American justices of the peace
Methodists from New York (state)
American Freemasons
Burials in New York (state)